Shaayad is a 1979 Bollywood film starring Neeta Mehta as Sudha, Vijayendra Ghatge as Dr Rakesh, Om Puri as Nandlal and Naseeruddin Shah as Saroj Kumar 'Saroj' in the main roles. The supporting cast includes Bharat Kapoor (as Aatish Indori), Purnima Jairam (as Dr Rita), Nitin Sethi (as Dr Nitin Mathur), Farida Jalal (as Sister Mazy, Nurse), Atam Prakash, Rahul Sengar, Raakesh Trivedi, Romesh Joshi, Murlidhar Gupta, Shivkant Pande, Ashok Awasthi and baby Manisha Munshi (as Aastha, Sudha's daughter). Special appearances are by Nadira as Sudha's mother, Iftekhar as Prosecution lawyer, Achyut Potdar as Judge and Simi Garewal as Defence attorney.

The music is composed by Manas Mukherjee and the songs have been written by Vitthalbhai Patel, Nida Fazli and late Dushyant Kumar Tyagi. The six songs in the film have been sung by Mohd Rafi, Manna Dey, Asha Bhosle, Usha Mangeshkar, Nitin Mukesh, Preeti Sagar, Sudhakar Athale and baby Sagarika Mukherjee (daughter of music director Manas Mukherjee).

Cast 
 Vijayendra Ghatge as Dr. Rakesh
 Neeta Mehta as Sudha, Saroj's Wife.
 Naseeruddin Shah as  Saroj Kumaar.
 Simi Garewal as Defence Lawyer.
 Iftekhar as Publice Prosecutor
 Farida Jalal as Nurse Maisie
 Bharat Kapoor as Atish Indori.
 Achyut Potdar as Judge
 Om Puri as Nandlal

Plot
The story begins with Dr Rakesh (Vijayendra Ghatge) joining the Maharaja Yeshwantrao Chikitsalaya. He goes to meet his ex-flame Sudha (Neeta Mehta) at her place where she stays with her husband Saroj Kumar (Naseeruddin Shah) and daughter Aastha (Manisha Munshi). Saroj and Rakesh become good friends but Rakesh is sad to meet his ex-flame Sudha as someone else's wife. He goes in flashback mode and recalls the days when they were romancing and planning to marry. When Rakesh asks Sudha's hand from her mother (Nadira), she mentions that she had been a prostitute all her life and would his parents accept Sudha, being the daughter of a prostitute as their bahu. If they accept Sudha then she has no problem. Rakesh assures her that there will be no hassles in that but later when Rakesh meets Sudha, he informs her that his parents refused to accept her as his bride but he is willing to marry her. She spurns his offer saying that without his parents blessings, they cannot marry each other.

Rakesh visits Sudha and Saroj frequently and finds that Saroj, who is a chain-smoker and a writer by profession, has coughing bouts very often. He advises Saroj to get admitted for 3 days in his hospital so that he can carry out various tests to ascertain his ailment. Saroj gets admitted though not willingly and finds the hospital confinement, injections and medicines very disgusting. The test reports confirm that he has lung cancer and that too in an advanced stage. When Rakesh breaks this news to Sudha and Saroj, they are shattered. Rakesh assures them that he will do his best to treat Saroj. Sister Mazy (Farida Jalal) is very popular and active in the hospital but has to leave daily at 6 in the evening to meet her boy-friend. One day, she is admitted in the same hospital due to gangrene in her knee. Her leg has to be amputated. One of the patients, Nandlal (Om Puri) is a chain beedi-smoker and is always up to mischief along with fellow patients. He keeps moving around the hospital asking beedis and matches from others. He befriends Saroj and borrows magazines from him for reading. In between, a hooch tragedy occurs and several victims are brought for admission in the hospital. There is a sudden spurt of serious patients and their kith and kin. Several die during treatment and the atmosphere in the hospital is one of grief, trauma and doom. Among the victims is Saroj's close friend Aatish Indori (Bharat Kapoor). Saroj is aggrieved to see his friend die in his arms.

As time passes, Saroj's condition worsens and he repeatedly asks Rakesh to poison him to death as he cannot suffer the pain. Rakesh is shocked and gives solace to Saroj to endure and live on. Sudha gives full mental support to Saroj so that he finds reason to live. She beseeches Rakesh to do his best as a doctor. However, Saroj keeps requesting Rakesh to kill him and relieve him from the pain. Rakesh imagines the pain Saroj is undergoing and ponders over mercy-killing. He discusses the matter with his colleagues, who feel shocked at Rakesh's thinking. Saroj asks Sudha to marry someone after his demise and asks her to come to him attired as a bride. She does so and they share very happy moments in each other's arms. Rakesh sees her outside in the corridor coming out of the hospital room in her bridal dress and feels drawn to her and beseeches her to marry him after Saroj's death as he still loves her. She admonishes him for such thinking and goes off in disgust. Next day, she finds Rakesh standing gloomily in the corridor outside Saroj's room. She gets panicky and rushes in to find Saroj's lifeless body in the bed. She suspects Rakesh for killing Saroj.

Police come to arrest Rakesh as post-mortem report mentioned that death was due to excessive morphine. The morphine injection ampules issued to Rakesh also seemed to be missing and unaccounted. The scene moves to the court where the Prosecution lawyer (Iftekhar) and Defence attorney (Simi Garewal) examine and cross-examine various witnesses before the judge (Achyut Potdar). The accused Rakesh seems to be sure to get convicted. One day, Nandlal discovers a suicide note written by Saroj to his wife Sudha in the magazine he quietly borrowed from Saroj from under his pillow, when he was asleep. He quickly rushes to the court and hands it over to the Defence attorney. She produces the note before the judge who acquits Rakesh by dismissing the criminal case after going through the note. The film ends with Rakesh, Sudha and her daughter Aastha shown together.

Soundtrack 
All songs were composed by Manas Mukherjee.

"Khushbu Hu Mai Phool Nahi" - Mohammed Rafi, Sagarika Mukherjee
"Main Suraj Ki Roshni Tu Chanda Ki Chandani" - Asha Bhosle, Mohammed Rafi
"Mausam Ayega Jayega Pyaar Sada Muskurayega" - Asha Bhosle, Manna Dey
"Yeh Zuban Humse Si Nahi Jati" - Usha Mangeshkar
"Do Dilo Ko Aise Mila Lo" - Sudhakar Athle, Nitin Mukesh, Preeti Sagar
"Din Bhar Dhoop Ka Parvat" - Manna Dey

External links
 

1979 films
1970s Hindi-language films